is a Japanese former freestyle swimmer. She competed in two events at the 1964 Summer Olympics.

References

External links
 

1945 births
Living people
Japanese female freestyle swimmers
Olympic swimmers of Japan
Swimmers at the 1964 Summer Olympics
Place of birth missing (living people)